The Northrop F-89 Scorpion is an American all-weather, twin-engined interceptor aircraft built during the 1950s, the first jet-powered aircraft designed for that role from the outset to enter service. Though its straight wings limited its performance, it was among the first United States Air Force (USAF) jet fighters equipped with guided missiles and notably the first combat aircraft armed with air-to-air nuclear weapons (the unguided Genie rocket).

Design and development
The Scorpion stemmed from a United States Army Air Forces (USAAF) Air Technical Service Command specification ("Military Characteristics for All-Weather Fighting Aircraft") for a night fighter to replace the P-61 Black Widow. The preliminary specification, sent to aircraft manufacturers on 28 August 1945, required two engines and an armament of six guns, either  machine guns or  autocannon. The revised specification was issued on 23 November; it did not specify jet propulsion, but the desired maximum speed of  virtually dictated that all the submissions would be jet-powered. The aircraft was to be armed with aerial rockets stored internally and six guns split between two flexible mounts, four guns forward and two in the rear. Each mount had to be capable of 15° of movement from the aircraft's longitudinal axis. Each mount's guns were to be automatically controlled by radar. For ground attack, it had to be capable of carrying  bombs and to be able to carry a minimum of eight rockets externally. Bell Aircraft, Consolidated-Vultee, Douglas Aircraft, Goodyear, Northrop and Curtiss-Wright all submitted proposals. In March 1946, the USAAF selected the Curtiss-Wright XP-87 Blackhawk, adapted from its proposed XA-43 attack aircraft and the Northrop N-24 design, one of four submitted by the company.

The N-24, designed by Jack Northrop, was a slim-bodied swept-wing aircraft with a two-person pressurized cockpit and conventional landing gear. To reduce drag, the two Allison J35 turbojet engines were buried in the lower fuselage, directly behind their air intakes, and they exhausted underneath the rear fuselage. The horizontal stabilizer was mounted just above the junction of the vertical stabilizer with the fuselage and had some dihedral.

A contract for two aircraft, now designated the XP-89, and a full-scale mock-up was approved on 13 June. However, the mock-up construction began immediately after the USAAF announced that the N-24 had been selected. It was inspected on 25 September and the USAAF had some reservations. The inspectors believed that the radar operator needed to be moved forward, closer to the pilot, with both crewmen under a single canopy, the magnesium alloy components of the wing replaced by aluminum alloy, and the fuel tankage directly above the engines moved. Other changes had to be made as wind tunnel and other aerodynamic tests were conducted. The swept wings proved less satisfactory at low speeds, and a thin straight wing was selected instead. Delivery of the first prototype was scheduled for November 1947, 14 months after the inspection. The position of the horizontal stabilizer also proved to be unsatisfactory, as it was affected by the engine exhaust, and it would be "blanked-out" by airflow from the wing at high angles of attack. It was moved halfway up the tail, but its position flush with the leading edge of the vertical stabilizer proved to cause extra drag through turbulence and reduced the effectiveness of the elevators and rudder. Moving the horizontal stabilizer forward solved the problem. Another major change occurred when USAAF revised its specification to delete the rear gun installation on 8 October. Another mock-up inspection was held on 17 December, and the inspectors suggested only minor changes, even though the fuselage fuel tanks were still above the engines. Northrop's efforts to protect the fuel tanks were considered sufficient, as the only alternative was redesigning the entire aircraft.

The XP-89 had a thin, straight, mid-mounted wing and a crew of two seated in tandem. The slim rear fuselage and the high-mounted horizontal stabilizer led to Northrop employees calling it the Scorpion—a name later formally adopted by the Air Force. The intended armament of four 20-millimeter M24 cannon in a small nose turret was not ready when the XP-89 was completed in 1948. Pending the availability of either turret under development, an interim six-gun fixed installation, with 200 rounds per gun, was designed for the underside of the nose. The thin wing had an aspect ratio of 5.88, a thickness-to-chord ratio of 9% and used a NACA 0009-64 section, which was selected for its low drag at high speed and stability at low speeds. A further advantage of the straight wing was that it could accommodate heavy weights at the wingtips. The wing could not fit the circular-type (rotating) spoilerons used in the P-61, so Northrop used the "decelerons" designed for the unsuccessful XP-79 prototype. These were clamshell-style split ailerons, which could be used as conventional ailerons, as dive brakes, or function as flaps as needed. All flying surfaces, the flaps, and the landing gear were hydraulically powered. The thin wing dictated tall, thin, high-pressure mainwheel tires, while the low height of the fuselage required the use of dual wheels for the nose gear.

The terms of the initial contract were revised and formalized on 21 May 1947, with the price increased to $5,571,111. The delivery date of the first aircraft was scheduled for 14 months (July 1948) from signing and the second 2 months after that. A month before the prototype made its first flight on 16 August 1948 at Muroc Army Air Field, the USAF changed its designation for fighter aircraft from "P" to "F". The XF-89 was fitted with  Allison J35-A-9 turbojets and proved to be seriously underpowered. Initial flights were made with conventional ailerons, decelerons not being installed until December.

Several months earlier, the Air Force conducted a competitive evaluation of the three existing all-weather interceptor prototypes, the XF-87, the XF-89, and the US Navy's XF3D. The evaluators were qualified night-fighter pilots, radar operators, and experienced maintenance non-commissioned officers. The pilots were not impressed with any of the aircraft and recommended procurement of an interim aircraft that resulted in the development of the Lockheed F-94 Starfire from the training version of the Lockheed F-80 Shooting Star. The F-89 was the fastest of the three contenders, although it was in last place in cockpit arrangement and ease of maintenance. One pilot claimed that the XF-89 was the only real fighter and compared the XF-87 to a medium bomber and the XF3D to a trainer. The full Committee on Evaluation overruled those evaluators, preferring the Northrop design, as it had the greatest potential for development. The Air Force subsequently canceled the production contract for the F-87 to free up money for the Scorpion.

By November 1949, the second aircraft was virtually complete. Still, the Air Force was concerned about the design's poor thrust-to-weight ratio and decided to implement a weight-reduction program, as well as upgrade the engines to the more powerful Allison J33-A-21 fitted with an afterburner. Other major changes included the replacement of the nose gun turret by the Hughes-designed six-gun nose, AN/ARG-33 radar, and Hughes E-1 fire-control system, permanent wingtip fuel tanks, and the ability to lower the complete engine for better maintenance access. The new nose added  to the length of the aircraft. It was redesignated YF-89A to reflect its role as a pre-production testbed to evaluate equipment and changes planned for the F-89A production aircraft. The aircraft was complete by February 1950.

After repairs from a crash landing on 27 June 1949, the XF-89 was flown to March AFB to participate in the RKO movie Jet Pilot in February 1950. Shortly afterward, the aircraft crashed on 22 February, killing the observer, when flutter developed in the elevator, and the subsequent vibrations caused the entire tail to break off. Construction of the production models was suspended until the reasons for the accident were discovered. Engineering and wind-tunnel tests revealed that the geometry of the rear fuselage and the engine exhaust created flutter-inducing turbulence aggravated by the exhaust's high-frequency acoustic energy. Fixes for the problem involved the addition of a "jet wake fairing" at the bottom rear of the fuselage between the engines, external ("ice tong") mass balances for the elevator, pending the design of internal mass balances, and the addition of exhaust deflectors to the fuselage to reduce the turbulence and the consequent flutter.

Well before the YF-89A was complete, a $39,011,622 contract was awarded to Northrop on 13 May 1949 for 48 F-89A aircraft, one static test airframe, and the modifications made to the YF-89A.

Operational history

Production was authorized in January 1949, with the first production F-89A flying in September 1950. It had AN/APG-33 radar and an armament of six 20-millimeter T-31 cannon with 200 rounds per gun. The swiveling nose turret was abandoned, and  fuel tanks were permanently fitted to the wingtips.

Only 18 F-89As were completed, mainly used for tests and trials, before the type was upgraded to F-89B standard with new avionics. The type entered service with the 84th Fighter-Interceptor Squadron in June 1951, experiencing considerable problems with engines and other systems, and soon gave way to the F-89C. Despite repeated engine changes, problems persisted, compounded by the discovery of structural problems with the wings that led to the grounding of the F-89 and forced a refit of 194 -A, -B, and -C models.

The major production model was the F-89D, which first flew on 23 October 1951 and entered service in 1954. It removed the cannon in favor of a new Hughes E-6 fire control system with AN/APG-40 radar and an AN/APA-84 computer. Armament was two pods of fifty-two  "Mighty Mouse" FFAR rockets. A total of 682 were built. In August 1956 a pair of F-89D interceptors were scrambled from Oxnard Air Force Base to shoot down a runaway F6F-5K drone leading to the so-called Battle of Palmdale.

Proposed re-engined F-89s, designated F-89E and F-89F, were not built, nor was a proposed F-89G that would have used Hughes MA-1 fire control and GAR-1/GAR-2 Falcon air-to-air missiles like the Convair F-106 Delta Dart.

The subsequent F-89H, which entered service in 1956, had an E-9 fire control system like that of the early F-102 and massive new wingtip pods, each holding three Falcons (usually three semi-active radar homing GAR-1s and three infrared GAR-2s) and 21 FFARs, for a total of six missiles and 42 rockets. Problems with the fire-control system delayed the -H's entry into service, by which time its performance was notably inferior to newer supersonic interceptors, so it was phased out of USAF service by 1959.

The final variant was the F-89J. This was based on the F-89D, but replaced the standard wingtip missile pod/tanks with  fuel tanks and fitted a pylon under each wing for a single MB-1 Genie nuclear rocket (sometimes supplemented by up to four conventional Falcon air-to-air missiles). The F-89J became the only aircraft to fire a live Genie as the John Shot of Operation Plumbbob on 19 July 1957. There were no new-build F-89Js, but 350 -Ds were modified to this standard. They served with the Air Defense Command, later renamed the Aerospace Defense Command (ADC), through 1959 and with ADC-gained units of the Air National Guard through 1969. This version of the aircraft was extensively used within the Semi Automatic Ground Environment (SAGE) air-defense system.

A total of 1,050 Scorpions of all variants were produced.

Variants
XF-89
First prototype, powered by two  Allison J35-A-9 engines.
XF-89A
Second prototype. Fitted with more powerful  dry ( wet) Allison J35-A-21A engines and revised, pointed nose with cannon armament.
F-89A
First production version, eight built. Fitted with a revised tailplane and six cannon armaments.
DF-89A
F-89As converted into drone control aircraft.
F-89B
Second production version with upgraded avionics. 40 built.
DF-89B
F-89Bs converted into drone control aircraft.
F-89C
Third production version with more powerful  dry ( wet) Allison J35-A-33 engines. 164 built.
YF-89D
Conversion of one F-89B to test new avionics and armament of F-89D.
F-89D
Main production version, which saw the deletion of the six 20-millimeter cannons in favor of 104 rockets in wing pods, installation of a  new Hughes E-6 fire-control system, AN/APG-40 radar, and the AN/APA-84 computer. This new system allowed a lead-collision attack in place of the previous lead-pursuit-curve technique. A total of 682 were built.
YF-89E
One-off prototype to test the  dry ( wet) Allison YJ71-A-3 engine, converted from an F-89C.
F-89F
Proposed version with revised fuselage and wings, powered by  dry ( wet) Allison J71-A-7 engines, never built.
F-89G
Proposed version equipped with Hughes MA-1 fire control and GAR-1/GAR-2 Falcon air-to-air missiles, never built.
YF-89H
Modified F-89D to test features of F-89H. Three converted.
F-89H
Version with E-9 fire control system, six Hughes GAR-1/GAR-2 Falcon missiles, and 42 Folding Fin Aircraft Rockets (FFAR). 156 built.

F-89J
Conversion of F-89D with underwing hardpoints for two MB-1 (later AIR-2) Genie nuclear-armed rocket and four Falcon missiles, and carrying either the standard F-89D rocket/fuel pod or pure fuel tanks. 350 were converted from F-89Ds.

Operators
 see also: F-89 Scorpion units of the United States Air Force

 United States Air Force
 Air National Guard

Aircraft on display

F-89B
 49-2457 – Lakeview Park, Nampa, Idaho.

F-89D
 52-1862 – Elmendorf AFB, Anchorage, Alaska. Marked as 53-2453 (actual 53-2453 is an F-89J below) Previously displayed at Tyndall AFB, Florida.
 53-2463 – Museum of Aviation, Robins Air Force Base, Georgia.
 53-2494 – home base of the 158th Fighter Wing, Vermont Air National Guard, Burlington Air National Guard Base, Vermont.
 53-2517 – Planes of Fame Museum, Chino, California. The rudder of 53-2519 was added to the aircraft at the museum.
 53-2536 – EAA AirVenture Museum, Oshkosh, Wisconsin.
 53-2610 – Air Force Armament Museum, Eglin Air Force Base, Florida.
 53-2646 – Friendship Park, Smithfield, Ohio.
 53-2674 – Pima Air & Space Museum (adjacent to Davis-Monthan Air Force Base), Tucson, Arizona.
 53-2677 – Minnesota Air National Guard Museum, Minneapolis, Minnesota.

F-89H
 54-0298 – Dyess Linear Air Park, Dyess Air Force Base, Texas.
 54-0322 – Hill Aerospace Museum, Hill Air Force Base, Utah.

F-89J
 52-1856 – Bangor International Airport / Bangor Air National Guard Base (former Dow AFB), Maine.
 52-1868 – Selfridge Military Air Museum, Selfridge ANGB, Michigan.
 52-1896 – New England Air Museum, Windsor Locks, Connecticut.
 52-1911 (painted as 53-2509) – National Museum of the United States Air Force, Wright-Patterson Air Force Base, Dayton, Ohio. This aircraft was the last F-89 remaining in service when it was transferred to the Museum from the Maine Air National Guard in July 1969.
 52-1927 – Castle Air Museum (former Castle AFB), Atwater, California.
 52-1941 – Peterson Air and Space Museum, Peterson Air Force Base, Colorado.
 52-1949 – March Field Air Museum, March Air Reserve Base (former March AFB), Riverside, California.
 52-2129 – Air Power Park and Museum (near Langley Air Force Base), Hampton, Virginia.
 53-2547 – 120th Fighter Wing of the Montana Air National Guard at Great Falls Air National Guard Base, Great Falls International Airport, Montana. It is the only F-89 to have ever fired a Genie rocket with a live nuclear warhead, having done so as part of Operation Plumbob.
 53-2453 – Heritage Flight Museum, Burlington, Washington. (note: see 52-1862 above, marked as 53-2453)
 53-2604 – 119th Wing of the North Dakota Air National Guard, Fargo Air National Guard Base / Hector Field, Fargo, North Dakota.

Specifications (F-89D)

See also

References

Notes

Bibliography
 Angelucci, Enzo and Peter Bowers. The American Fighter. Yeovil, UK: Haynes Publishing Group, 1987. .
 Blazer, Gerald and Mike Dario. Northrop F-89 Scorpion. Leicester, UK; Aerofax, 1993. .
 Davis, Larry and Dave Menard. F-89 Scorpion in Action (Aircraft Number 104). Carrollton, Texas: Squadron/Signal Publications, 1990. .
 Green, William and Gordon Swanborough. The Complete Book of Fighters: An Illustrated Encyclopedia of Every Fighter Aircraft Built and Flown. London: Salamander Books, 1994. .
 Isham, Marty J. and David R. McLaren. Northrop F-89 Scorpion: A Photo Chronicle. Atglen, Pennsylvania: Schiffer Military History, 1996. .
 Kinsey, Bert. F-89 Scorpion, (Detail and Scale Vol. 41). Waukesha, Wisconsin: Kalmbach Publishing, 1992. .
 Knaack, Marcelle Size. Encyclopedia of US Air Force Aircraft and Missile Systems, Volume 1, Post-World War Two Fighters, 1945–1973. Washington, D.C.: Office of Air Force History, 1978. .
 "Scorpion with a Nuclear Sting: Northrop F-89". Air International, Vol. 35, No. 1, July 1988, pp. 44–50. Bromley, UK: Fine Scroll. .
 "Scorpion with a Nuclear Sting: Northrop F-89—Part Two". Air International, Vol. 35, No. 2, August 1988, pp. 86–92. Bromley, UK: Fine Scroll. .
 Swanborough, F. Gordon and Peter M. Bowers. United States Military Aircraft Since 1909. London: Putnam, 1963. .

External links

 Joe Baugher F-89 pages
 "First Look Inside The USAF F-89 Scorpion Fighter," Popular Science 1951 article with cutaway of F-89 with original six 20 mm cannon nose, article at bottom of page
 (1957) T.O. 1F-89D-1 Flight Handbook USAF Series F-89D Scorpion Aircraft (Part 1),  (Part 2)

1940s United States fighter aircraft
F-089 Scorpion
Twinjets
Mid-wing aircraft
Aircraft first flown in 1948